The 2018–19 season was the 1st for Aris in the Super League after its return top division of Greece. The club also competed in the Greek Cup and were eliminated in the group stage.

First-team squad

Transfers and Loans

Transfers In

Transfers Out

Loans In

Loans Out

Transfer summary

Spending

Summer:  100.000 €

Winter:  75.000 €

Total:  175.000 €

Income

Summer:  300.000 €

Winter:  70.000 €

Total:  370.000 €

Net Expenditure

Summer:  200.000 €

Winter:  5.000 €

Total:  195.000 €

Competitions

Overall

Overview

{| class="wikitable" style="text-align: center"
|-
!rowspan=2|Competition
!colspan=8|Record
|-
!
!
!
!
!
!
!
!
|-
| Super League

|-
| Greek Cup

|-
! Total

Managers' Overview

{| class="wikitable" style="text-align: center"
|-
!rowspan=2|Manager
!rowspan=2|Nat.
!rowspan=2|From
!rowspan=2|Until
!colspan=8|Record
|-
!
!
!
!
!
!
!
!
|-
| Paco Herrera
| 
| Start of Season
| 5 November 2018

|-
| Apostolos Terzis
| 
| 6 November 2018
| 13 November 2018

|-
| Savvas Pantelidis
| 
| 14 November 2018
| End of Season

|-

Super League

League table

Results summary

Results by matchday

 Due to the postponement of 15th matchday: No 15 corresponds to 16th matchday, No 16 to 17th matchday, No 17 to 17th matchday, No 18 to 18th matchday and No 19 to 15th matchday

Matches

Greek Cup 

Aris Thessaloniki entered the competition in the Group Stage, in the Pot 2, because it promoted from the Football League Football League . The final five clubs of the last Super League are introduced to the tournament in the Round of 16 and they are seeded in the draw. In the draws for the quarter-finals onwards, there are no seedings.

Group stage

Matches

Squad statistics

Appearances

Goals

Clean sheets

References

Aris Thessaloniki F.C. seasons
Greek football clubs 2018–19 season